The Florida State Seminoles cross country program represents Florida State University (variously Florida State or FSU) in the sport of cross country running. The program includes separate men's and women's cross country teams, both of which compete in National Collegiate Athletic Association (NCAA) Division I and the Atlantic Coast Conference (ACC). The men's cross country team officially started in 1962; the women's team began in 1968.

The men's team has had eight All-Americans and finished as NCAA runner-up in 2010 while the women's team has had thirteen All-Americans and finished as NCAA runner-up in 2009 and 2010.

Coaching staff
Bob Braman is the head coach for the Florida State Seminoles cross country and track and field programs.

See also 
Florida State Seminoles
Florida State Seminoles track and field
History of Florida State University
List of Florida State University professional athletes

References

External links 

  Seminoles.com – Official website of the Florida State Seminoles cross country team.